The governor of Phnom Penh is the chief executive of Phnom Penh, the capital of Cambodia. The governor is also the head of the Phnom Penh Capital Hall and is appointed to a term of four years. The current governor is Khuong Sreng, who was appointed on 16 June 2017.

List of governors
This is a list of governors of Phnom Penh since 1941.

Between 1941 to 1970

Between 1970 to 1975

Since 1979

References

 01
Mayors of places in Cambodia
.
Cambodian politicians